This list of ancient Italic peoples includes names of Indo-European peoples speaking Italic languages or otherwise considered Italic in sources from the late early 1st millennium BC to the early 1st millennium AD.

Ancestors

Proto-Indo-Europeans (Proto-Indo-European speakers)
Proto-Italics (Proto-Italic speakers)

Latino-Faliscans
Falisci
Capenates (in Capena and Ager Capenas, Capena land)
Falerii (in Falerii and Ager Faliscus)
Sardinia Falisci (in and around Peronia, northeastern Sardinia)
Aborigines (mythology) (Casci Latini) - Latium Sicels
Prisci Latini (Old Latins) (according to tradition and legend they were formed by the merger of Aborigines and Latium Sicels)
Latini (Latins (Italic tribe))
Abolani
Aesulani
Acienses
Albans (Albani) (Populi Albenses) (in Alba Longa Land, between the modern-day Lake Albano and Monte Cavo)
Antemnates (in Antemnae) (sometimes regarded as Sabines)
Bolani / Bovillani
Bubetani
Cusuetani (originally Latin tribe that was conquered and assimilated by the Volsci)
Coriolani, Old / Old Coriolani (originally Latin tribe that was conquered and assimilated by the Volsci)
Ficani (in Ficana Land)
Latin Fidenates (originally Latin tribe that was conquered and assimilated by the Etruscans, for some centuries Fidenates were Etruscans - the Fidenates Etruscans, however in the 8th century BC, Rome, after a war with Veii and Fidenae, conquered Fidenae and established a Roman Latin colony there - Fidenae Novae, and the Fidenae land was Latinized again)
Foreti / Foretii
Hortenses
Latinienses / Romans (Romani) (Ancient Romans) (originally in Rome and Ager Romanus or Ager Latinienses, Roman land, later throughout the Roman Empire)
Roman tribes (originally there were three tribes: Luceres, Ramnes and Tities, later with Roman expansion increased to 35)
Roman gentes (sing. gens - clan) (originally they were only Roman Latins, but later, with Roman expansion, several clans of other peoples were also included, such as the Sabines, Etruscans and other Italics)
Longulani (originally Latin tribe that was conquered and assimilated by the Volsci)
Macrales
Manates
Munienses
Mutucumenses
Numinienses
Octulani
Olliculani
Pedani
Polluscini (originally Latin tribe that was conquered and assimilated by the Volsci)
Querquetulani
Sicani, Latium (Latium Sicani) (not to be confused with the Sicily's Sicani)
Sisolenses
Tolerienses (in Toleria or Tolerium Land)
Tutienses
Velienses
Venetulani, Latium / Latium Venetulani (may have been an originally Venetian tribe that was Latinized and assimilated)
Vimitellarii
Vitellenses
Opici

Osco-Umbrians / Sabellians
Umbrians
Aequi
Hernici
Marsi
Praetutii (in Ager Praetutianus, their name gave origin to the name of Abruzzo region)
Sabines (Sabini)
South Picentes/South Picenes (Pupeneis)
Volsci
Oscans
Alfaterni (in Salerno region)
Aurunci (may have been the same people as the Ausones but with a different cognate name; Rhotacism: s > r)
Ausones (may have been the same people as the Aurunci but with a different cognate name)
Campanians (Campani)
Frentani (sometimes classified as Samnites, who they were originally descended from)
Lucanians
Bruttii
Marrucini
Paeligni
Picentini (in Picentini Mounts)
Samnites (Safineis)
Caraceni
Caudini
Hirpini
Pentri
Sidicini
Vestini

Other possible Italic peoples
Elymi? (Elymians)
Oenotri? (Oenotrians)
Itali
Morgetes?
Sicels (Siculi)
Rutuli?
Sicani?

Veneti
Usually they are included as an Italic people by many scholars. However other scholars argue that they could have been a transitional people between Celts and Italics, a Celticized Italic people or a Para-Celtic people.
Carni? (may have been a Celtic tribe)
Catali
Catari
Histri
Iapydes
Liburnians (Liburni)
Alutae (chief town: Aluus or Aloiis)
Assesiates
Buni
Burnistae
Caulici
Curictae (on the island of Curicta, now Krk)
Encheleae
Fertinates
Flanates (chief town: Flanona, which gave name to the Sinus Flanaticus)
Hymani (or Ismeni)
Hythmitae
Lacinienses
Lopsi (chief town: Lopsica, now Sveti Juraj)
Mentores
Olbonenses
Peucetiae
Stlupini
Syopii
Varvarini (chief town: Varvaria)
Secusses
Subocrini
Veneti Proper
Venetulani

See also
 Prehistoric Italy
 Italic peoples
 List of Roman tribes
 List of Roman gentes
 List of ancient peoples of Italy
 List of ancient Greek tribes

References

Further reading
Gianna G. Buti e Giacomo Devoto, Preistoria e storia delle regioni d'Italia, Sansoni Università, 1974
Giovanni Pugliese Carratelli, Italia, omnium terrarum alumna, Officine grafiche Garzanti Milano, Garzanti-Schewiller, 1990
Giacomo Devoto, Gli antichi Italici, 2a ed. Firenze, Vallecchi, 1951.
Gary D. Farney, Guy Bradley (edits.) (2018). The Peoples of Ancient Italy. Boston, Berlin: Walter de Gruyter.
Sabatino Moscati, Così nacque l'Italia: profili di popoli riscoperti, Società editrice internazionale, Torino 1998.
Niebuhr, Barthold Georg. (1835). The History of Rome. Philadelphia: Thomas Wardle
Francisco Villar, Gli Indoeuropei e le origini dell'Europa, Bologna, Il Mulino, 1997. 
Vittore Pisani, Lingue preromane d'Italia. Origini e fortune, 1978.

External links
 - Source texts of ancient Greek and Roman authors

 - Strabo's work The Geography (Geographica). Books 5 and 6 are about Italy (each region has a chapter).

 
Lists of ancient Indo-European peoples and tribes
Italic
ancient Italic peoples